Alexander Schüller (born 13 May 1997) is a German bobsledder.

He won a medal at the IBSF World Championships 2020.

References

External links

Alexander Schüller at the German Bobsleigh, Luge, and Skeleton Federation 

1997 births
Living people
German male bobsledders
Sportspeople from Leipzig
Bobsledders at the 2022 Winter Olympics
Olympic bobsledders of Germany
Olympic medalists in bobsleigh
Olympic gold medalists for Germany
Medalists at the 2022 Winter Olympics
21st-century German people